is a 1998 Japanese original video animation (OVA) series. It is the fourth and last arc of the Future GPX Cyber Formula 2 OVA series. The story focuses on Bleed Kaga as he struggles to settle the score with Hayato Kazami.

Synopsis
Hayato Kazami and his exclusive race machine, Asurada, finished the Cyber Formula World Grand Prix XVI in 2021 successfully by defending his champion title. After the end of the Grand Prix, Kazami's racing team, Sugo Grand Prix, announces the contract of sponsorship with GIO Motors Inc., thus becoming Sugo GIO Grand Prix.

Meanwhile, Aoi ZIP Formula prepares its return to the Grand Prix after a year of a disgraceful super license suspension. However, Kyoko Aoi, the re-instated owner of Aoi ZIP Formula, receives a grim news from the executive officers of Aoi Motors that they would allow the team to join the Grand Prix with the outdated machine, Ex-Superion Z/A 10, and that the team will disband after the 2022 season unless a champion title is secured, as the officers fear that the rival group GIO's success in CF would greatly damage the already ruined reputation of the company. Bleed Kaga, not knowing this desperate situation coming towards him, returns to Japan to prepare for a test run and waited for the moment to challenge his arch-rival, Hayato Kazami.

After the end of the Grand Prix, Kaga retired from CF and sent his farewell messages to both Nagumo, who congratulated him for winning the race and thanking him on behalf of his brother and Kyoko, who resigned the ownership of the team and hopes to find the great driver who can replace him, respectively. Along with Grey and Phill, Kaga left Japan and headed back to the United States, he discarded his name of Bleed and assumed his real name, Jotaro.

References

External links
 Future GPX Cyber Formula SIN at official Future GPX Cyber Formula website
 

 
1998 anime OVAs
Fiction set in 2022
Medialink
Sunrise (company)